Satyabadi (Sl. No.: 109) is a Vidhan Sabha constituency of Puri district, Odisha.

This constituency includes Satyabadi block and Kanas block.

Elected Members

Fifteen elections were held between 1951 and 2009.
Elected members from the Satyabadi constituency are:
2019: (109): Umakanta Samantray (Biju Janata Dal)
2014: (109): Umakanta Samantray (Independent)
2009: (109): Prasad Kumar Harichandan (Congress)
2004: (55): Ramaranjan Baliarsingh (Independent)
2000: (55): Prasad Kumar Harichandan (Congress)
1995: (55): Prasad Kumar Harichandan (Congress)
1990: (55): Chandramadhab Mishra (Janata Dal)
1985: (55): Rabindra Kumar Das (Congress)
1980: (55): Rabindra Kumar Das (Congress-I)
1977: (55): Chandramadhab Misra (Janata Party)
1974: (55): Gangadhar Mahapatra (Congress)
1971: (51): Chandramadhab Misra (Independent)
1967: (51): Gangadhar Mahapatra (Congress)
1961: (92): Raj Raj Dev Ganatantra Parishad)
1957: (64): Nilakantha Das (Congress)
1951: (84): Nilakantha Das (Independent)

2019 Election Result

2014 Election Result

2009 Election Results
In 2009 election, Indian National Congress candidate Prasad Kumar Harichandan defeated Biju Janata Dal candidate Umakanta Samantray by a margin of 8,280 votes.

Notes

References

Assembly constituencies of Odisha
Puri district